Epiplema tenebrosa is a moth of the family Uraniidae.

References

Moths of Asia
Uraniidae